Metherell may refer to:

Places 

 Metherell, Devon neolithic stone-hut circle enclosure as spelt on 1763 tithe map. Note (also 20th century spelling as Metherall) 
 Metherell, Devon a farmstead located next to the Fernworthy Reservoir, Dartmoor National Park, Devon United Kingdom
 Metheral Hill ancient mining area within the military compound at Dartmoor NPA, near Oke Tor and South Zeal village.
 Metherell, Cornwall a village in Cornwall, United Kingdom

People 

 Jack Metherell (born 1912), footballer
 Len Metherell (born 1908), footballer
 Terry Metherell (born 1947), politician